Methylcytosine dioxygenase TET1-like is a protein that in humans is encoded by the LOC107984557 gene.

References